Francesco Piccolomini (died 1622) was a Roman Catholic prelate who served as Bishop of Grosseto (1611–1622).

Biography
On 17 August 1611, Francesco Piccolomini was appointed during the papacy of Pope Paul V as Bishop of Grosseto.
On 6 November 1611, he was consecrated bishop by Giovanni Garzia Mellini, Cardinal-Priest of Santi Quattro Coronati, with Alessandro Borghi (bishop), Bishop Emeritus of Sansepolcro, and Antonio Maria Franceschini, Bishop of Amelia, serving as co-consecrators. 
He served as Bishop of Grosseto until his death in May 1622. 
While bishop, he was the principal co-consecrator of Gregorio Pomodoro, Bishop of Larino (1616) .

References

External links and additional sources
 (for Chronology of Bishops) 
 (for Chronology of Bishops)  

17th-century Italian Roman Catholic bishops
Bishops appointed by Pope Paul V
Bishops of Grosseto
1622 deaths